Cairo is an unincorporated community in Pratt County, Kansas, United States.  It is located between the cities of Pratt and Cunningham.

History
Cairo had a post office from 1887 until 1922.

References

Further reading

External links
 Pratt County maps: Current, Historic, KDOT

Unincorporated communities in Pratt County, Kansas
Unincorporated communities in Kansas